Joseph Tang Yuange (born November 17, 1963) is a Sichuanese (Chinese) Catholic priest and Bishop of the Roman Catholic Diocese of Chengdu since 2016.

Biography
Tang was born in Jintang County, Sichuan, on November 17, 1963. From 1984 to 1988 he studied at the Sichuan Catholic Theological and Philosophical College.

He was ordained a priest in 1991. He was elected Bishop of Chengdu. He accepted the episcopacy with the papal mandate on November 30, 2016.

See also 
 Catholic Church in Sichuan

References

1963 births
Sichuanese Roman Catholics
People from Jintang County
Living people
21st-century Roman Catholic bishops in China